Mario Caterino (born June 14, 1957 in Casal di Principe) is an  Italian Camorrista and member in the Casalesi clan from Casal di Principe in the province of Caserta between Naples and Salerno. He was on the "most wanted list" of the Italian ministry of the Interior since 2005, for murder and membership in the Camorra, until he was arrested on May 2, 2011 in Casal di Principe.

He received a life sentence at the Spartacus Trial against the Casalesi clan.

See also
List of fugitives from justice who disappeared

References

1957 births
Camorristi
Casalesi clan
Living people
People from the Province of Caserta